Akota is an urban area in the western side of Vadodara City, in the state of Gujarat, in India. Earlier it was known as "Anakotakka", as mentioned in one of the Akota Bronzes. The suburb is located on the banks of river Vishwamitri.

It is one of the oldest areas of the ever growing Western part of Vadodara. Akota is largely residential area with large shopping malls and some of the best hotels in Gujarat.Akota was a major centre of Jainism during 5th century AD.

See also
Akota Bronzes

Urban and suburban areas of Vadodara